Sal Cannella (born September 23, 1942) is an American politician who served as a member of the California State Assembly from 1990 to 1996.

Early life 
Cannella was born in 1942 in Newark, New Jersey. In 1953, he moved with his family to Stanislaus County, California. He graduated from Ceres High School in Ceres, California.

Career

Local government 
Cannella served on the Ceres City Council from 1976 until 1980 and as Mayor of Ceres from 1980 until 1982, when he was elected to the Stanislaus County Board of Supervisors. He was reelected to the board in 1986.

State Assembly
Canella was on track to win reelection again in 1990 when he decided to run for a special election for the California State Assembly that January. He won the race for the 27th district vacated by Democrat Gary Condit (who had been elected to Congress) and was reelected that November and again in 1992 and 1994 (in the renumbered 26th district).

1998 State Senate race
Although California state term limits prevented Cannella from seeking reelection in 1996, he announced his candidacy for the California State Senate seat held by Republican Dick Monteith in 1998. Democrats (led by then President Pro Tem John Burton) campaigned for Cannella, who lost the election with 44% of votes cast.

Personal life
Cannella and his wife Donna have three children: Nicole, Anthony and Vincent. In 2010, Anthony Cannella, was elected state senator for the 12th district as a Republican.

References

External links
JoinCalifornia, Election History for the State of California

Living people
Democratic Party members of the California State Assembly
Date of birth missing (living people)
People from Newark, New Jersey
People from Stanislaus County, California
People from Ceres, California
1942 births